Exim Bank (Tanzania) (EBT), is a commercial bank in Tanzania, the second-largest economy in the East African Community. The bank is licensed by the Bank of Tanzania, which is the country's central bank and national banking regulator.

Overview
EBT is a large banking institution, providing  commercial banking services to individuals, small-to-medium-sized businesses (SMEs), and large corporate clients.

The Exim Bank Group was the fifth largest commercial bank group  in the country, by assets, as of April 2014. By June 2016, the bank's total assets had grown to TSh 1.5 trillion (approx. US$700.8 million). Following the acquisition of the business and assets of United Bank Tanzania Limited, in November 2019, Exim Bank (Tanzania), increased its assets to US$732.4 million.

History
EBT was formed in 1997 by a group of Tanzanian business people, following the liberalization of the Tanzanian economy. It reportedly broke even within the first five months of operation. , EBT maintained wholly owned banking subsidiaries in the Comoros, Djibouti and Uganda. It is the first indigenous Tanzanian bank to own subsidiaries outside the country, as at March 2016. In April 2010, the bank was authorized by the Bank of Tanzania to establish subsidiaries in Djibouti and Zambia, thus setting up the Exim Bank (East Africa) Group, a regional banking financial services organization. In March 2016, EBT acquired 58.6% of Imperial Bank (Uganda) Limited and changed its name to Exim Bank (Uganda) Limited. In November 2019, Exim Bank Tanzania acquired the businesses and assets of United Bank Tanzania Limited, a subsidiary of the Pakistan bank, United Bank Limited. In July 2022, Exim Bank Tanzania acquired First National Bank of Tanzania, bringing total group assets to TSh 2.4 trillion (US$1.033+ billion).

Exim Bank Group (East Africa)
Exim Bank Tanzania, is the largest subsidiary of the Exim Bank Group (East Africa), a large financial services conglomerate, that maintains its headquarters in Dar es Salaam, Tanzania's largest city. Members of the banking group include:

 Exim Bank (Tanzania) - Dar-es-Salaam, Tanzania
 Exim Bank (Comoros) - Moroni, Comoros
 Exim Bank (Djibouti) - Djibouti City, Djibouti.
 Exim Bank (Uganda) - Kampala, Uganda.

Ownership
The stock of Exim Bank (Tanzania) is owned by private individuals and corporate entities. The current shareholding in the bank is summarized in the table below:

Branch network
, EBT maintains 33 branches at the following locations inside Tanzania:

 Clock Tower Branch - Samora Avenue, Dar es Salaam
 Exim Tower Branch - Exim Tower, Dar es Salaam
 Hill Park Branch - Mlimani City, Dar es Salaam
 Samora Avenue Branch - 9 Samora Avenue, Dar-es-Salaam
 Kariakoo Branch - Morogoro Road, Dar es Salaam
 Mkwepu Branch - Mkwepu Street, Dar es Salaam
 Namanga Branch - Namanga, Dar es Salaam
 Nyerere Road Branch - Nyerere Road, Dar es Salaam
 Temeke Branch - Chang'ombe, Dar es Salaam
 Mwanza Branch - Kenyatta Road, Mwanza
 Arusha Branch - Goliondoi Road, Arusha
 Mount Meru Branch - Uhuru Road, Arusha
 Moshi Branch - Boma Road, Moshi
 Tanga Branch - Independence Avenue, Tanga
 Zanzibar Branch - Mlandege Street, Zanzibar
 Morogoro Branch - Lumumba Road, Morogoro
 Mbeya Branch - Industrial Area, Mbeya
 Mtwara Branch - Tanu Road, Mtwara
 Iringa Branch - Iringa
 Shinyanga Branch - Shinyanga
 Tabora Branch - Tabora
 Karatu Branch - Karatu
 Kigoma Branch - Kigoma
 Mwanakwerekwe Branch- Zanzibar
 Lumumba Branch - Ushirika Towers, Lumumba Street, Dar es Salaam
 Udom Branch - UDOM College of Informatics, Dodoma

Governance
The Chairman of the Board is Ambassador Juma Mwapachu, a non-Executive Director. The Chief Executive Officer is Jaffari Matundu, who is a non-shareholder.

See also
 List of banks in Tanzania
 Economy of Tanzania
 Exim Bank (Djibouti)

References

External links
Website of Exim Bank Tanzania 
Exim Bank Attributes Success To Transparency And Innovation
 Exim Bank Embarks On Robust Expansion Drive

Banks of Tanzania
Banks established in 1997
Companies of Tanzania
Economy of Dar es Salaam
1997 establishments in Tanzania